Chitato Airport  is an airport serving Dundo, Angola.

The Chitato (Ident: CH) and Dundo (Ident: DU) non-directional beacons are located south of the field.

Dundo is also served by the larger Dundo Airport, which is southwest of the city.

The IATA code refers to the town's colonial name of Portugalía.

See also

 List of airports in Angola
 Transport in Angola

References

External links 
OpenStreetMap - Chitato
OurAirports - Chitato

Airports in Angola